Madison Township is one of the twelve townships of Vinton County, Ohio, United States.  The 2010 census found 605 people in the township, 278 of whom lived in the village of Zaleski.

Geography
Located in the center of the county, it borders the following townships:
Brown Township: north
Knox Township: east
Vinton Township: south
Clinton Township: southwest corner
Elk Township: west
Swan Township: northwest corner

It is one of only two county townships without a border on another county.

Zaleski, the second-smallest village in Vinton County, is located in northwestern Madison Township.

Prattsville is an unincorporated community in Madison Township, Vinton County, Ohio. It is located about 5 miles east of the county seat McArthur at the intersection of US 50 and State Route 278.

Name and history
It is one of twenty Madison Townships statewide.

Government
The township is governed by a three-member board of trustees, who are elected in November of odd-numbered years to a four-year term beginning on the following January 1. Two are elected in the year after the presidential election and one is elected in the year before it. There is also an elected township fiscal officer, who serves a four-year term beginning on April 1 of the year after the election, which is held in November of the year before the presidential election. Vacancies in the fiscal officership or on the board of trustees are filled by the remaining trustees.

References

External links
Vinton County Chamber of Commerce 

Townships in Vinton County, Ohio
Townships in Ohio